.fk is the country code top-level domain (ccTLD) for the Falkland Islands.

Registrants must be Falkland Islands residents.

Only registrations at third levels are possible under these second-level sub-domains:
 .co.fk – for commercial organizations
 .org.fk – for non-commercial organizations
 .gov.fk – for government organizations
 .ac.fk – for academic organizations
 .nom.fk – for private individuals
 .net.fk – for ISP and similar network organizations

References

External links
IANA .fk whois information
.fk domain registration website

Country code top-level domains
Communications in the Falkland Islands

sv:Toppdomän#F